Keckiella breviflora (formerly Penstemon breviflorus) is a species of flowering shrub in the plantain family known by the common name bush beardtongue.

It is native to many of the western Transverse Ranges, Inner California Coast Ranges and the Sierra Nevada in California, and its range extends just into Nevada.

Description
Keckiella breviflora is a branching, bushy shrub with many thin stems, approaching a maximum height near two meters.

Its shiny green leaves are arranged oppositely on the branches, and each is one to four centimeters long, generally lance-shaped and finely serrated or smooth along the edges.

The shrub produces tall inflorescences which are loose, glandular spikes of flowers. Each flower is one to two centimeters wide with five pale pink or pinkish-streaked white lobes whose external surfaces have long, shiny hairs. The three lower lobes curl outward from the mouth and under, and the two upper lobes are joined into a lip that curves forward over the mouth. Within the mouth are long stamen filaments bearing anthers, and a flat, hairless, sterile stamen called a staminode.

External links
Jepson Manual Treatment of Keckiella breviflora
Keckiella breviflora  — UC Photos gallery

breviflora
Flora of California
Flora of Nevada
Flora of the Sierra Nevada (United States)
Natural history of the California chaparral and woodlands
Natural history of the California Coast Ranges
Natural history of the Central Valley (California)
Natural history of the Transverse Ranges
Flora without expected TNC conservation status